is an American actor of Japanese descent. He is best known for his role as Chozen Toguchi in The Karate Kid franchise. He has also appeared in such films as Real Genius (1985), True Believer (1989), Contact (1997), The Truman Show (1998), Pearl Harbor (2001), Only the Brave (2006), Inception (2010) and Driven (2018).

Early life
Okumoto, a third generation Japanese American (Sansei), was born and raised in Los Angeles, California. He began karate at age 13, studying under various sensei. By the time of The Karate Kid Part II, the 27-year-old Okumoto held a brown belt in Karate, and had learned basic skills in other martial arts, including Kung Fu and Judo. His Judo Instructor was Hayward Nishioka, his Chitō-ryū Karate Sensei was Yukinori Kugimiya, his Kajukenbo Instructor was Sensei Ron Takaragawa, and his Yau Kung Moon Sifu was Kevin Quock.

He graduated from Hollywood High School and Cal State Fullerton, where he studied acting.

Career
His performance in the play Indians led to being signed by an agent, and eventually a role on The Young and the Restless. His first roles were in The Check is in the Mail, Real Genius, and Better Off Dead. Perhaps his most well-known role is as Daniel's rival, Chozen Toguchi in the 1986 film, The Karate Kid Part II. In 2005, he was Yukio Nakajo in Lane Nishikawa's film Only the Brave about the Japanese American segregated fighting unit, the 442nd Regimental Combat Team of World War II. This film also included two other Karate Kid stars, Tamlyn Tomita and Pat Morita. Other credits include his role as Shu Kai Kim, a character based on Chol Soo Lee, in the 1989 film True Believer, Pete Kapahala in the 1999 Disney Channel original movie Johnny Tsunami, Kaigun-Daii  in Pearl Harbor, and Bruce Takedo in the television series, Bones. He is a producer for the 2020 independent film The Paper Tigers, in which he has a small role as well.

In 2021, Okumoto reprised his Karate Kid II role as Chozen Toguchi, who, beginning with Season 3 of Cobra Kai, is now a friend and ally of Daniel.

Personal life
Okumoto lives in Seattle, Washington, with his wife Angela and their three daughters. They own and run a Hawaiian-themed restaurant, Kona Kitchen/Yuji’s Bar & Lounge.

Filmography

Film

Television

Video games

References

External links

 

American male film actors
American male television actors
American male video game actors
American male voice actors
American film actors of Asian descent
Living people
Male actors from Los Angeles
American male actors of Japanese descent
California State University, Fullerton alumni
20th-century American male actors
21st-century American male actors
1959 births
American karateka
American judoka